The 1941 Rio de Janeiro Grand Prix was a Formula Libre motor race held at Gávea on 28 September 1941.

Classification

References

1940–1941 GRAND PRIX SEASON

Rio de Janeiro Grand Prix, 1941
Rio de Janeiro Grand Prix
Auto races in Brazil
Brazil sport-related lists